is a 1979 film adaptation of a famous Japanese folk tale, and the novel Taro, the Dragon Boy by Miyoko Matsutani. In 1966, Taro, the Son of Dragon with the original Japanese title of "Tatsu, no ko Taro", started as a puppet series on a Japanese television channel. In the late 1970s the anime television series Taro the Dragon Boy (original story by Miyoko Matsutani) was shown on Indian national television.

Plot 
In the distant past of Japan, a lazy and selfish Taro loves to eat and sleep and wrestle with the animals. With no direction in his life, a Tengu appears that gives him a special potion. With this potion, he gains the strength of a hundred men - but he can only use it when he is helping others. After drinking the potion, Taro, day by day, begins to understand what it means to help others, first by fighting Akaoni (Red Oni) to save Aya, a young girl gifted with the flute, then by helping others in his village collect fire wood.

One night his grandmother tells him of his mother's transformation into a dragon. Taro then begins his search for his mother. Before his search for his mother starts, Taro again confronts Akaoni after hearing from the animals that Aya was captured by Kurooni (Black Oni). After a brief fight, Akaoni agrees to help Taro save Aya from Kurooni. After besting Kurooni, Taro finds out he has also saved a village terrorized by Kurooni and Akaoni, the latter bullied into the former's service.

Taro then aids Akaoni by throwing him into the clouds to serve the thunder god. After the village celebrates Taro's deeds, he starts his search. He comes upon an old woman and is tricked into service in her rice paddies. After a successful harvest year and learning the truth from a giant serpent living in the lake next to the old woman's rice farm, Taro takes the fruits of his labor and gives it to the old woman's former employees and others, leaving her with little.

During his conversation with the serpent, Taro learns that nine mountains over lives a yamanba that could point him in the right direction. Taro takes that information and finds the yamanba. The yamanba tells him what he seeks and lets slip she was responsible for the serpent. After narrowly escaping the yamanba, Taro is overpowered by yukionna.

The following morning, Aya finds Taro near frozen and able to revive him. With her aid, Taro finds the lake where his mother, Tatsu, now lives. Tatsu tells Taro why she was transformed; as a mother heavy with child fulfilling her duties to her unborn child, she needed to eat, but neglecting her duties to the rest of her village, she left nothing of her catch for the other workers.

Taro then proposes a means to make the lives of the villagers back home better, by making for them a new home with large rice paddies. Taro and Tatsu them attempt to break the dam that formed the lake Tatsu resides in. Although they succeed, Tatsu's body is broken, and after seeing the lake had emptied, Taro concluded she had died. Mourning the loss of his mother, Taro is relieved to see her life was returned and she is yet again human. Their actions are successful and the new flooded low lands enable prosperity for all the villagers Taro has helped, not only along his way but from his home village.

Cast

See also
 Kintarō, hero from a similar fairy tale
 Momotarō, hero from a similar fairy tale

References

External links
 
 

1979 films
Toei Company films
1979 anime films
Discotek Media
Toei Animation films
Films based on folklore
Animated films about dragons
1970s children's animated films